The People's Party (PP) is a political party in Malta. Ideologically, it is right-wing populist and conservative, and it opposes immigration.

History 
The People's Party was registered in July 2020 under the leadership of Paul Salomone, who had previously contested the 2008 election on the list of National Action.

In the first annual general meeting held on 4 August 2020, Paul Salomone was confirmed leader of the party. Salomone registered the party in July 2020 and would launch the party later in November same year.

In the 2022 general election, the party contested with a total of 8 candidates in all 13 districts. They failed to elect any of their candidates.

Ideology 
The People's Party shares the same name as that of People's Party of 1895 that was founded by Sigismondo Savona. However, in December 2021, the People's Party remembered Enrico Mizzi.

The party has coupled the traditional conservative-populist positions with Eurosceptic and anti-immigration stances.

Its political foundational document, entitled The Pillars of the People's Party, described it as seeking "wider use of the referendum", promoting the principle of subsidiarity locally and at European level, supporting "the traditional family without prejudice to the rights of non-traditional families", opposing "the abuse of the asylum system to facilitate economic migration" and seeking to "represent Malta in Europe rather than Europe in Malta".

It organized anti-green pass protests on 16 January 2022. Furthermore, the party also protested against preventive measures against COVID-19, such as the distribution of vaccines.

Regarding LGBT+ policy, the party has espoused a conservative and anti-LGBT+ attitude, wanting to revert some of the newer laws and policy which aim to assist or protect LGBT+ people. The party is in favor of discrimination when it comes to adoption, wanting heterosexual couples to be prioritized over non-heterosexual couples. Partit Popolari has also embraced the cutting of government funding for gender affirming care for all ages and the raising of the minimum age to 21, despite the medical age of consent being 16 in Malta. The party made a Facebook post on 13 January 2023 disproving to the government's strengthening of a law which strengthens bans on gay conversion therapy, claiming that it is trampling on individual liberty. Similar beliefs can also be seen in the party manifesto. On 7 February 2023 another Facebook post by the party claimed that they are against "Indoctrination of our children at school", in reference to an article regarding new government policy aimed at making schools more inclusive.

Electoral history

House of Representatives

References 

Right-wing parties in Europe
Eurosceptic parties in Malta
Maltese nationalism
Conservative parties in Malta
Political parties established in 2020